"Things I'd Like to Say" is a song by the American rock band New Colony Six, released in 1968 on their album Revelations and as a single. The song became a top 20 hit in the U.S., peaking at number 16 on the Billboard Hot 100 and at number 13 on the Cash Box Top 100 Singles chart, and a top 10 hit in Canada, peaking at number 6 on the RPM Top Singles chart. It also peaked at number 2 on the WLS 89 Hit Parade on 30 December 1968 in the band's home city of Chicago.

The song also peaked at number 17 on the Billboard Easy Listening chart and at number 7 on the RPM Adult Contemporary chart.

Chart performance

Weekly charts

Year-end charts

References

External links
 Lyrics of this song

1968 songs
1968 singles
Mercury Records singles